Wristmeetrazor is an American metalcore band that originally started as a solo project in Washington, D.C. in 2017. Members are now located in Louisville, KY, Las Vegas, NV, Springfield, VA, and Newark, DE.

History
The band started out as a project by guitarist Jonah Thorne, taking its name from a Usurp Synapse song. With the release of a demo, Thorne would recruit bassist Justin Fornof and drummer Zach Wilbourn. Taking heavy influence from the early-2000s hardcore scene, the trio would then issue two extended plays I Talk to God... and ...But the Sky is Empty digitally through their bandcamp page and on various physical formats through a variety of labels. As a result of the members living in different states in the country, each member of the band had to record their parts at separate locations, emailing them to each other in order for them to be mixed.

After recruiting new drummer Bryan Prosser, the band signed onto Prosthetic Records in 2018 for the release of their debut full-length Misery Never Forgets. Featuring artwork from Pg.99 vocalist Chris Taylor, the album was released digitally on January 18, 2019, with physical releases being issued on CD and LP formats. Tracks such as "XOXO (Love Letter from a Loaded Gun)" and "Insecurity Checkpoint" were released as singles to help promote the record. Loudwire named it one of the 50 best metal albums of 2019.

Members 
 Current members
 Justin Fornof – vocals (2017–present), bass (2017-2021)
 Bryan Prosser – drums, percussion, vocals (2018–present)
 Tyler Norris – guitars (2019–present)
 userelaine – bass (2021–present)
 Nathan Billmyer - guitars (2022–present)

 Former members

 Jonah Thorne – guitars, vocals (2017–2022)
 Zach Wilbourn – drums, percussion (2017)

Discography
Studio albums
Misery Never Forgets (January 18, 2019, Prosthetic)
Replica of a Strange Love (June 11, 2021, Prosthetic)

Extended plays
Demo (May 13, 2017, self-released) (Cassette edition issued by Parking Lot Records)
I Talk to God... (September 6, 2017, self-released) (Cassette edition issued by Arduous Path Records)
...But the Sky is Empty (December 12, 2017, self-released) (Cassette edition issued by Bitter Melody Records)

Compilation albums
I Talk to God... But the Sky is Empty 2x7" (December 12, 2017, Zegema Beach Records/Time As a Color)

References

External links
Wristmeetrazor on Bandcamp
Wristmeetrazor on Facebook
Wristmeetrazor on Discogs

Musical groups established in 2017
2017 establishments in Washington, D.C.
Metalcore musical groups from Washington, D.C.